= Bayerisches Volksecho =

West German Communist newspaper (1951–56)

- Founded: June 1951
- Ceased publication: August 17, 1956
- Political alignment: Communist
- Language: German language
- Headquarters: Munich
- Circulation: ~50,000 (1955)
- OCLC number: 225184034

Bayerisches Volksecho ('Bavarian People's Echo') was a German language daily newspaper, published from Munich, West Germany between June 1951 to August 17, 1956. Bayerisches Volksecho was the regional organ of the Communist Party of Germany in Bavaria. As of 1955, the newspaper had a daily circulation of around 50,000. Bayerisches Volksecho was banned along with the Communist Party in 1956.
